Paradorn Srichaphan was the defending champion and won in the final 6–2, 6–4 against James Blake.

Seeds
A champion seed is indicated in bold text while text in italics indicates the round in which that seed was eliminated.

  Paradorn Srichaphan (champion)
  Gustavo Kuerten (quarterfinals)
  Tommy Robredo (second round)
  Fernando González (first round)
  Félix Mantilla (first round)
  Agustín Calleri (second round)
  Younes El Aynaoui (semifinals)
  Albert Costa (first round)

Draw

References
 2003 TD Waterhouse Cup Draw

Connecticut Open (tennis)
2003 ATP Tour